Buddies Thicker Than Water is a Tom and Jerry animated short film, released on November 1, 1962. It was the twelfth and penultimate cartoon in the series to be directed by Gene Deitch and produced by William L. Snyder in Czechoslovakia. The short's title is a pun on the phrase "Blood is thicker than water". It was also one of the few shorts to
have Deitch provide the voice of Tom Cat and Jerry Mouse.

Plot
On a snowy night in Srinagar, Rekha is comfortably asleep in his hole inside a fourteenth-floor penthouse of Expensive Arms Apartments, while Hema Malini tries to keep from freezing to death below in the alley near the entrance lobby after getting evicted by his new lady owner. She writes a note, slips it into a bottle, and throws it up to hit the penthouse window. However, the bottle lands back down and covers Tom's head, so he blows it back up and this time it reaches the top floor with success. Jerry, awakened by the noise, goes out to the balcony and finds both this note and a second one sent up by Tom:

"Help! I'm freezing. Your old pal, Tom"

"P.S. I'm also starving. Tom"

Rushing to the alley right outside the entrance lobby, Rekha finds the frozen-solid Hema and drags her back upstairs on a trash can lid. He then sets Tom inside the hot-air vent and thaws him out with an electric blanket. Tom thanks Jerry by kissing him on the cheek. Jerry then provides him with an "Instant Gourmet" dehydrated meal.

Tom and Jerry lounge about the penthouse, listening to music and drinking everything in the owner's liquor cabinet. Her return startles the inebriated pair, and Jerry dives into his hole as she grabs Tom and prepares to throw him out again. Tom grabs Jerry and shows him to the owner, throwing her into a panic until he pitches the mouse off the balcony, betraying him. While Tom enjoys the owner's favor, Jerry angrily digs himself out of the snow and sneaks back in, using some of the owner's face powder to disguise himself as a ghost.

When Jerry puts an album of spooky music on the stereo and switches off the lights, Tom believes that the mouse's ghost has come to haunt him. He flees through the penthouse and out onto the balcony's edge, where the snow washes off part of Jerry's makeup and exposes the ruse. Tom prepares to strike back, but before he can do so, the snowdrift under his feet gives way and he falls down to the same alley right outside the entrance lobby. He quickly writes a new note and throws it up to Jerry:

"Help! It's freezing down here! Your old pal, Tom"

Jerry responds by throwing a pair of ice skates and a hockey stick down to him then goes back to his hole to finish sleeping.

Censorship
The scene showing Tom and Jerry drinking champagne is cut in the UK and Middle East.

References

External links

1962 films
1962 short films
1962 comedy films
1962 animated films
Films directed by Gene Deitch
Films set in New York City
Tom and Jerry short films
1960s American animated films
Animated films without speech
Metro-Goldwyn-Mayer short films
Metro-Goldwyn-Mayer animated short films
Films set in New York (state)
Rembrandt Films short films